is a passenger railway station located in the city of Matsuyama, Ehime Prefecture, Japan. It is operated by JR Shikoku and has the station number "Y54".

Lines
Connections with other local or limited express trains are needed to travel further east or west along the line.

Layout
The station consists of two opposed side platforms serving two tracks. Line 1, served by platform 1 on the side of the station building, is a straight track while line 2, served by the opposite side platform, is a passing loop. The station building is unstaffed and houses a waiting room and an automatic ticket vending machine. Access to platform 2 is by means of a footbridge. A siding branches off line 1 and juts in partially on the other side of platform 1.

History
At that time the station was operated by Japanese Government Railways, later becoming Japanese National Railways (JNR). With the privatization of JNR on 1 April 1987, control of the station passed to JR Shikoku.

Surrounding area
Mitsuhama Port (30 minutes on foot)

See also
 List of railway stations in Japan

References

External links
 Station timetable

Railway stations in Ehime Prefecture
Railway stations in Japan opened in 1927
Railway stations in Matsuyama, Ehime